Tortola is the largest and most populated island of the British Virgin Islands, a group of islands that form part of the archipelago of the Virgin Islands.

Although the British Virgin Islands (BVI) are under the British flag, it uses the U.S. dollar as its official currency due to its proximity to and frequent trade with the U.S. Virgin Islands and Puerto Rico. The island is home to many offshore companies that do business worldwide. Financial services are a major part of the country's economy.

On 6 September 2017, the British Virgin Islands were extensively damaged by Hurricane Irma. The most severe destruction was on Tortola. News reports over the next day or two described the situation as "devastation".

History 

Local tradition recounts that Christopher Columbus named the island Tórtola, meaning "turtle dove" in Spanish. In fact, Columbus named the island Santa Ana.  Dutch colonists called it Ter Tholen, after Tholen, a coastal island that is part of the Netherlands. When the British took over, the name evolved to Tortola.

On his second voyage for the Spanish Crown to the Caribbean or West Indies, Christopher Columbus spotted what are now called the British and U.S. Virgin Islands. He named the archipelago after the 11,000 virgins of the 5th-century Christian martyr St. Ursula. The Spanish made a few attempts to settle the islands, but pirates such as Blackbeard and Captain Kidd were the first permanent residents.

In the late 16th century, the English, who had successfully settled the area contesting claims by the Dutch, established a permanent plantation colony on Tortola and the surrounding islands. Settlers developed the islands for the sugarcane industry, with large plantations dependent on the slave labor of Africans bought from local chiefs and transported across the Atlantic. The majority of early settlers came in the late eighteenth century: Loyalists from the Thirteen Colonies after the American Revolutionary War were given land grants here by the Crown to encourage development. They brought their slaves with them, who outnumbered the British colonists. The sugar industry dominated Tortola economic history for more than a century until the abolishment of slavery.

In the early 19th century, after Britain abolished the international slave trade, the Royal Navy patrolled the Caribbean to intercept illegal slave ships. The colony settled liberated Africans from these ships on Tortola, in the then-unsettled Kingstown area. St. Phillip's Church was built in the early 19th century in this community as one of the earliest free black churches in the Americas.

After the abolition of slavery in the British colonies in 1834, planters found it difficult to make a profit in the sugar industry based on paying and managing free labor. At this time, Cuba and some South American countries still had slave labor in the sugar industry. In addition, there were changes in the sugar industry, with sugar beets cultivated in England and the United States offering a competing product. During the downturn as sugar agriculture became less profitable, a large proportion of the white landowning population left the British Virgin Islands.  In 1867, an earthquake and tsunami hit the island.

In the late 1970s, the British businessman Ken Bates attempted to lease a large part of the neighboring island of Anegada on a 199-year lease, but this action was blocked. Noel Lloyd, a local activist, led a protest movement forcing the local government to drop the plan.  Today, a park on Tortola is named after Noel Lloyd and features a statue in his honour.

Hurricane Irma
On 6 September 2017, Tortola was extensively damaged by Hurricane Irma. A report by Sky News summarized the aftermath of the storm as: "The scale of the damage on the island of Tortola is truly shocking. You have to see it to appreciate just how massive this storm really was. The East End area of Tortola looks like a war zone; no building is untouched, the debris of entire houses destroyed, yachts, cars and enormous cargo containers is scattered in all directions and this is just one area."

By 8 September, the UK had sent the Royal Engineers and Commandos to reinstate law and order and to set up satellite communications with the world. More troops were expected to arrive a day or two later, but the ship
, carrying more extensive assistance, was not expected to reach the Virgin Islands for another two weeks. The Premier of the Virgin Islands, Orlando Smith, called for a comprehensive aid package to rebuild the British Virgin Islands (BVI). On 10 September, the UK's prime minister Theresa May pledged £32 million to the Caribbean for a hurricane relief fund; the UK government would also match donations made by the public via the British Red Cross appeal. Specifics were not provided to the news media as to the amount that would be allocated to each island.

British Foreign Secretary Boris Johnson visited Tortola on 13 September 2017 to confirm the United Kingdom's commitment to helping restore British islands. He said he was reminded of photos of Hiroshima after it had been hit by the atom bomb.

Geography
Tortola lies near an earthquake fault, and minor earthquakes are common.

Government

The House of Assembly in the BVI consists of fourteen house representatives (the governor, four at-large, and one representative for each of the nine districts, eight of which are wholly or partially on Tortola). Whilst still under the British rule, the King appoints a Governor. The current Governor is John Rankin (diplomat), who is the Head of Cabinet in the BVI. The House of Assembly is run by the Speaker of the House. The Deputy Governor is David Archer, the Premier is Andrew Fahie. The National Democratic Party (NDP) served two straight terms in office until it was defeated by the Virgin Islands Party (VIP) in the 2019 general election. The party that rules over the house is determined by if that party has seven or more seats.

Economy and demographics
The population of Tortola is 23,908. The principal settlement is Road Town, the capital of the British Virgin Islands, with a population of 9,400.

Provision of financial services is a major part of the economy. The International Business Companies Act, passed in the early 1980s, encouraged such businesses and has generated significant growth in professional jobs and related revenues. BVI residents are amongst the most affluent in the Eastern Caribbean. Numerous residents from other Caribbean islands also work here.

Citco is a privately owned global hedge fund administrator headquartered in Tortolo, founded in 1948. It is the world's largest hedge fund administrator, managing over $1 trillion in assets under administration.

Although the British Virgin Islands (BVI) are under the British flag, Tortola uses the U.S. dollar as its official currency due to its proximity to and frequent trade with the U.S. Virgin Islands and Puerto Rico. The island is home to many offshore companies that do business worldwide.

The extensive damage (devastation) caused by Hurricane Irma in September 2017 affected the economy. Residents were looking to the UK to provide significant financial aid. Premier Orlando Smith called for a comprehensive aid package to rebuild the British Virgin Islands. The UK pledged £32 million of aid for Caribbean islands that were affected by the hurricane but did not provide specifics as to the amount that would be allocated to the BVI.

Attractions
The northern coast has the best beaches on the island, including Smuggler's Cove, Long Bay, Cane Garden Bay, Brewer's Bay, Josiah's Bay, and Lambert Beach. In addition to beaches, marine activities such as sailing, surfing, scuba diving, kite boarding, and windsurfing are available. Many tourists visit the historic sites and hike in parks. The island is visited regularly by large cruise ships.

Transportation
Tortola can be reached both by sea and by air. The island has taxi services.

Flights to Tortola arrive at the Terrance B. Lettsome International Airport.  The airport is located on Beef Island, just to the east of Tortola, and is connected by the Queen Elizabeth II Bridge. Seaborne Airlines, Cape Air and Air Sunshine provide scheduled service from San Juan. Island Birds Air Charter connects to San Juan, Saint Thomas, Antigua and St Marten. InterCaribbean Airways, Ltd. and Sky High Aviation Services offers non-stop flights between Dominican Republic and Beef Island. American Airlines flies jet service from Miami to Lettsome, via Saint Thomas. 

Many ferry companies provide travelers with the opportunity to arrive by sea. The ferries run between Charlotte Amalie in the center of St. Thomas, and Red Hook in the East End of St. Thomas and St. John, and either Road Town or the West End of Tortola.

Education
The British Virgin Islands operates several government schools.

The following pre-primary schools serve Tortola residents:
 Althea Scatliffe Pre-Primary School
 Enid Scatliffe Pre-Primary School

The following elementary schools serve Tortola residents:
 Century House Montessori School B.V.I
 Althea Scatliffe Primary School
 Seventh-day Adventist Primary School
 Enis Adams Primary School
 Joyce Samuel Primary School (formerly Belle Vue Primary School)
 Ivan Dawson Primary School
 Leonora Delville Primary School
 Francis Lettsome Primary School
 Alexandrina Maduro Primary School
 Isabella Morris Primary School
 Ebenezer Thomas Primary School
 Willard Wheatley Primary School
 St. Georges Primary School
 Cedar International School
 First Impressions School
 Pelican Gate School
 Agape Total Life Academy

The following High schools serve Tortola Residents:
 Elmore Stout High School (formerly British Virgin Islands High School)
 St George's Secondary School
 Seventh-day Adventist Secondary School
 Cedar International School
 Ansted  College and approved Distance University Programs
Eslyn Henley Richiez Learning Centre serves as Tortola's special-needs school.
The H. Lavity Stoutt Community College provides Tortola's tertiary education

Sports
Tortola has been one of the Caribbean's prime basketball destinations, hosting three of the last four Caribbean Basketball Championships. Horse racing is also a popular sport in the Virgin Islands, and Tortola's Ellis Thomas Downs is one of the three race tracks in the region.

Notable people

 J'maal Alexander, Olympic sprinter, was born in Tortola
 Melanie Amaro, lived in Tortola with her grandmother as a child; she was the season 1 winner of the X Factor reality show
 Isaac Glanville Fonseca, early political figure in the British Virgin Islands around the time of the restoration of democracy in 1950
 George French (1817–1881), born and raised in Tortola, was the Chief Justice of Sierra Leone and the British Supreme Court for China and Japan
 Samuel Hodge (c. 1840 – 1868), recipient of the Victoria Cross
 Richard Humphreys (philanthropist), silversmith and Founder of Cheyney University, the first historically black institute of higher learning in the United States
 Iyaz, international singing star, is from Carrot Bay, Tortola
 Jon Lucien (1942 – 2007), vocalist and musician, born Lucien Harrigan on the island of Tortola
 Stanley Nibbs (1914 – 1985), teacher and one of the first black citizens to appear on a BVI postage stamp

Images

See also
 British colonization of the Americas
 Dutch colonization of the Americas

References

External links

 Official website of the British Virgin Islands Tourist Board

Former English colonies